Jean-Pierre Patrick Rhyner Pebe (born 16 March 1996) is a professional footballer who plays as a centre-back for Swiss club Schaffhausen. Born in Switzerland, he represented both that nation and Peru U20 at youth international levels.

Club career
A youth product of Grasshoppers, Rhyner made his professional debut with his childhood team in a 2–0 2016–17 UEFA Europa League qualifying phase and play-off round loss to Fenerbahçe on 25 August 2016. He debuted for Grasshoppers in the Swiss Challenge League in a 4–0 loss to on 23 October 2016. On 30 January 2017, Rhyner was loaned out to Schaffhausen to gain first-team experience in the Swiss Challenge League.

On 8 January 2018, Rhyner returned to Grasshoppers after a successful year with Schaffhausen.

On 10 July 2019, Rhyner moved abroad and joined Spanish Segunda División side Cádiz CF on a three-year deal. On 5 October of the following year, after featuring rarely as his side achieved promotion to La Liga, he moved to FC Cartagena in the second division, on loan for one year.

On 16 January 2021, Rhyner moved to Eredivisie side FC Emmen, also in a temporary deal.

On 30 June 2021, he was announced by the Greek Super League side Volos as their new transfer.

On 8 July 2022, Rhyner returned to Schaffhausen.

International career
Born in Switzerland to a Swiss father and a Peruvian mother, Rhyner first represented the Peru national under-20 football team in a pair of friendlies in 2014 against the Venezuela U20s and Colombia u20s. Rhyner is also a youth international for Switzerland at the U20, and U21 levels. On 22 July 2020, FIFA approved a one-time nationality switch for Rhyner, making him eligible to represent Peru.

Career statistics

Club

References

External links
 
 
 SFL Profile
 GCZ Profile 
 FC Schaffhausen Profile

1996 births
Living people
Citizens of Peru through descent
Peruvian footballers
Association football defenders
Peru youth international footballers
Peruvian people of Swiss descent
Segunda División players
Cádiz CF players
FC Cartagena footballers
FC Emmen players
Volos N.F.C. players
Super League Greece players
Peruvian expatriate footballers
Peruvian expatriate sportspeople in Spain
Peruvian expatriate sportspeople in the Netherlands
Expatriate footballers in Spain
Expatriate footballers in the Netherlands
Swiss men's footballers
Footballers from Zürich
Switzerland youth international footballers
Swiss people of Peruvian descent
Swiss Super League players
Grasshopper Club Zürich players
Swiss Challenge League players
FC Schaffhausen players
Swiss expatriate footballers
Swiss expatriate sportspeople in Spain
Swiss expatriate sportspeople in the Netherlands